Lübeck (Low German also ), officially the Hanseatic City of Lübeck, is a city in Northern Germany. With around 217,000 inhabitants, Lübeck is the second-largest city on the German Baltic coast and in the state of Schleswig-Holstein, after its capital of Kiel, and is the 35th-largest city in Germany.

The city lies in Holstein, northeast of Hamburg, on the mouth of the River Trave, which flows into the Bay of Lübeck in the borough of Travemünde, and on the Trave's tributary Wakenitz. The city is part of the Hamburg Metropolitan Region, and is the southwesternmost city on the Baltic, as well as the closest point of access to the Baltic from Hamburg. The port of Lübeck is the second-largest German Baltic port after the port of Rostock. The city lies in the Northern Low Saxon dialect area of Low German.

Lübeck is famous for having been the cradle and the de facto capital of the Hanseatic League. Its city centre is Germany's most extensive UNESCO World Heritage Site.

While the city's symbol is the Holsten Gate, Lübeck's skyline is dominated by the seven towers of its five main churches St Mary's, Lübeck Cathedral, St Jacob's, St Peter's, and St Giles'. The cathedral, finished around 1230, was the first large brickwork church in the Baltic region. St Mary's, finished in 1351, served as model for the other Brick Gothic churches around the Baltic. It has the second-tallest two-steeples façade after Cologne Cathedral, which only surpassed it in 1880, the tallest brick vault, and is the second-tallest brickwork structure after St Martin's in Landshut. Lübeck is also known for Lübeck Marzipan.

History

Humans settled in the area around what today is Lübeck after the last Ice Age ended about 9700 BCE. Several Neolithic dolmens can be found in the area.

Around 700 AD, Slavic peoples started moving into the eastern parts of Holstein, an area previously settled by Germanic inhabitants who had moved on in the Migration Period. Charlemagne, whose efforts to Christianise the area were opposed by the Germanic Saxons, expelled many of the Saxons and brought in Polabian Slavs allies.

In the 10th century, it became the most important settlement of the Obotrite confederacy and a castle was built. In 1128, the pagan Rani from Rügen razed Liubice.

In 1143, Adolf II, Count of Schauenburg and Holstein, founded the modern town as a German settlement on the river island of Bucu. He built a new castle, first mentioned by the chronicler Helmold as existing in 1147. Adolf had to cede the castle to the Duke of Saxony, Henry the Lion, in 1158. After Henry's fall from power in 1181, the town became an Imperial city for eight years.

Emperor Barbarossa (reigned 1152–1190) ordained that the city should have a ruling council of 20 members. With the council dominated by merchants, pragmatic trade interests shaped Lübeck's politics for centuries. The council survived into the 19th century. The town and castle changed ownership for a period afterwards and formed part of the Duchy of Saxony until 1192, of the County of Holstein until 1217, and of the kingdom of Denmark until the Battle of Bornhöved in 1227.

Hanseatic city

Around 1200, the port became the main point of departure for colonists leaving for the Baltic territories conquered by the Livonian Order, and later, by the Teutonic Order. In 1226, Emperor Frederick II elevated the town to the status of an Imperial free city, by which it became the Free City of Lübeck.

In the 14th century, Lübeck became the "Queen of the Hanseatic League", being by far the largest and most powerful member of that medieval trade organization. In 1375, Emperor Charles IV named Lübeck one of the five "Glories of the Empire", a title shared with Venice, Rome, Pisa, and Florence.

Several conflicts about trading privileges resulted in fighting between Lübeck (with the Hanseatic League) and Denmark and Norway – with varying outcome. While Lübeck and the Hanseatic League prevailed in conflicts in 1435 and 1512, Lübeck lost when it became involved in the Count's Feud, a civil war that raged in Denmark from 1534 to 1536. Lübeck also joined the pro-Lutheran Schmalkaldic League of the mid-16th century.

Decline
After its defeat in the Count's Feud, Lübeck's power slowly declined. The city remained neutral in the Thirty Years' War of 1618–1648, but the combination of the devastation from the decades-long war and the new transatlantic orientation of European trade caused the Hanseatic League – and thus Lübeck with it – to decline in importance. However, even after the de facto disbanding of the Hanseatic League in 1669, Lübeck still remained an important trading town on the Baltic Sea.

From the Napoleonic wars to the Franco-Prussian war
In the course of the war of the Fourth Coalition against Napoleon, troops under Marshal Jean Baptiste Bernadotte (who would later become King of Sweden) occupied Lübeck after a battle against Prussian General Gebhard Blücher on 6 November 1806 due to the latter's illegal use of the city as a fortress, in violation of Lübeck's neutrality, following the French pursuit of his corps after the Battle of Jena-Auerstadt. Under the Continental System, the State bank went into bankruptcy. In 1811, the French Empire formally annexed Lübeck as part of France but the anti-Napoleonic allies liberated the area in 1813.

After Napoleon's defeat, the Congress of Vienna of 1815 recognised Lübeck as an independent free city. The city became a member of the German Confederation (1815–1866), the North German Confederation (1866–1871) and the German Empire (1871–1918). 

During the Franco-Prussian War, the battalion de Fusilier of Lübeck was part of the "2nd Hanseatic Infantry Regiment No. 76".
On the day of the Battle of Loigny the commander of the 17th Division, Hugo von Kottwitz, of the morning advanced in front of the Fusilier battalion of the regiment, urging them to "commemorate the bravery of the Hanseatic League". his attack in the north while the other battalions turned towards Loigny.

This shock surprised the French so much that they were invaded by their flank. They fled to the Fougeu place and were kicked out of this. The battle was to become the founding myth of the last Lübeck regiment, 3rd Hanseatic Infantry Regiment No. 162, which was founded in 1897. When the battalion commander returned to Lübeck with his battalion, he was appointed regimental commander.

20th century
At the end of the First World War and the fall of the German Empire, Lübeck became a member state of the Weimar Republic (1919–1933). After the Nazi seizure of power, Lübeck, like all other German states, was subjected to the process of Gleichschaltung (coordination). Subsequent to the enactment of the "Second Law on the Coordination of the States with the Reich" on 7 April 1933, Friedrich Hildebrandt was appointed to the new position of Reichsstatthalter (Reich Governor) of Lübeck on 26 May 1933. Hildebrandt installed  Otto-Heinrich Drechsler as the Bürgermeister, displacing the duly-elected Social Democrat, . Additionally, on 30 January 1934, the Reich government enacted the "Law on the Reconstruction of the Reich," formally abolishing all the state parliaments and transferring the sovereignty of the states to the central government. With this action, the Lübeck popular assembly, the Bürgerschaft, was dissolved and Lübeck effectively lost its rights as a federal state. Under the provisions of the Greater Hamburg Act, Lübeck was absorbed into the Prussian Province of Schleswig-Holstein, effective 1 April 1937, thereby losing its 711-year status as an independent free city.

During World War II (1939–1945), Lübeck became the first German city to suffer substantial Royal Air Force (RAF) bombing. The attack of 28 March 1942 created a firestorm that caused severe damage to the historic centre. This raid destroyed three of the main churches and large parts of the built-up area; the bells of St Marienkircke plunged to the stone floor.  Nearly 1,500 houses were completely destroyed, 2,200 heavily damaged and 9,000 slightly damaged. More than 320 people lost their lives. The industrial area of Lübeck was bombed on 25 August 1944 and 110 people were killed. In total, nearly 20% of the city centre was entirely destroyed, with particular damage in the Gründungsviertel neighborhood, where the rich merchants from the Hanseatic League had once lived. Germany operated a prisoner-of-war camp for officers, Oflag X-C, near the city from 1940 until April 1945. The British Second Army entered Lübeck on 2 May 1945 and occupied it without resistance.

On 3 May 1945, one of the biggest disasters in naval history occurred in the Bay of Lübeck when RAF bombers sank three ships: the SS Cap Arcona, the SS Deutschland, and the SS Thielbek – which, unknown to them, were packed with concentration-camp inmates. About 7,000 people died.

Lübeck's population grew considerably, from about 150,000 in 1939 to more than 220,000 after the war, owing to an influx of ethnic German refugees expelled from the former eastern provinces of Germany in the Communist Bloc. Lübeck remained part of Schleswig-Holstein after World War II (and consequently lay within West Germany). It stood directly on what became the inner German border during the division of Germany into two states in the Cold War period. The northernmost border crossing was in Lübeck's district of Schlutup. Lübeck spent decades restoring its historic city centre. In 1987, UNESCO designated this area a World Heritage Site.

On the night of 18 January 1996, a fire broke out in a home for foreign refugees, killing 10 people and severely injuring more than 30 others, mostly children. Most of the shelter's inhabitants thought it was a racist attack, as they stated that they had encountered other overt hostility in the city. The police and the local court were criticized at the time for ruling out racism as a possible motive before even beginning preliminary investigations. But by 2002, the courts found all the Germans involved not guilty; the perpetrators have not been caught.

In April 2015, Lübeck hosted the G7 conference.

Demographics
In 2020, the city had a population of 219,645. The largest ethnic minority groups are Turks, Central Europeans (Poles), Southern Europeans (mostly Greeks and Italians), Eastern Europeans (e.g. Russians), Arabs, and several smaller groups.

Population development since 1350:

Population structure:

Politics
The current mayor of Lübeck is Jan Lindenau of the Social Democratic Party (SPD). The most recent mayoral election was held in 2017. The Lübeck city council governs the city alongside the mayor.

Culture

Tourism 
In 2019, Lübeck reached 2 million overnight stays. Lübeck is famous for its medieval city centre with its churches, Holstentor, and small alleys. Lübeck has been called "Die Stadt der 7 Türme" (the city of seven towers) because of its seven prominent church towers. Like many other places in Germany, Lübeck has a long tradition of a Christmas market in December, which includes the famous handicrafts market inside the Heiligen-Geist-Hospital (Hospital of the Holy Spirit), located at the northern end of Königstrasse.

Buildings
Much of the old town has preserved its medieval appearance, with historic buildings and narrow streets. At one time, the town could only be entered by any of four town gates, two of which remain today, the well-known Holstentor (1478) and the Burgtor (1444).

The old town centre is dominated by seven church steeples. The oldest are Lübeck Cathedral and the Marienkirche (Saint Mary's), both dating from the 13th and 14th centuries.

Built in 1286, the Hospital of the Holy Spirit at Koberg is one of the oldest existing social institutions in the world and one of the most important buildings in the city. The Hospital functions both as a retirement and a nursing home. Some historical parts have been made available for public viewing.

Other sights include:
The City Hall
St. Catherine's Church, a church that belonged to a former monastery, now the Katharineum, a Latin school
Thomas Mann's house
Günter Grass's house
Church of St Peter
Church of St Lawrence, located on the site of a cemetery for people who died during the 16th-century plague
Church of St Jacob, 1334
Church of the Sacred Heart
Church of St Aegidien
the Salzspeicher, historic warehouses where salt delivered from Lüneburg awaited shipment to Baltic ports
The City of Travemünde on the Coast of the Baltic Sea.

Music, literature and the arts 
The composer Franz Tunder was principal organist in the Marienkirche, Lübeck, when he initiated the tradition of weekly Abendmusiken. In 1668, his daughter Anna Margarethe married the Danish-German composer Dieterich Buxtehude, who became the new organist at the Marienkirche. Some of the rising composers of the day travelled to Lübeck to witness his performances, notably Handel and Mattheson in 1703, and Bach in 1705.

Writer and Nobel laureate Thomas Mann was a member of the Mann family of Lübeck merchants. His well-known 1901 novel Buddenbrooks made readers in Germany (and later worldwide, through numerous translations) familiar with the manner of life and mores of the 19th-century Lübeck bourgeoisie.

Lübeck became the scene of a notable art scandal in the 1950s. Lothar Malskat was hired to restore medieval frescoes of the Marienkirche, which were unearthed as a result of severe bomb damage during World War II. Instead, he painted new works, which he passed off as restorations, fooling many experts. Malskat later revealed the deception himself. Writer and Nobel laureate Günter Grass featured this incident in his 1986 novel The Rat; from 1995 he lived close to  Lübeck in Behlendorf, where he was buried in 2015.

Museums
Lübeck has many small museums, such as the St. Anne's Museum Quarter, Lübeck, the Behnhaus, the European Hansemuseum, and the Holstentor. Lübeck Museum of Theatre Puppets is a privately run museum. Waterside attractions are a lightvessel that served Fehmarnbelt and the Lisa von Lübeck, a reconstruction of a Hanseatic 15th century caravel.
The marzipan museum in the second floor of Café Niederegger in Breite Strasse explains the history of marzipan, and shows historical wood molds for the production of marzipan blocks and a group of historical figures made of marzipan.

Food and drink 
 
Lübeck is famous for its marzipan industry. According to local legend, marzipan was first made in Lübeck, possibly in response either to a military siege of the city or a famine year. The story, perhaps apocryphal, is that the city ran out of all food except stored almonds and sugar, which were used to make loaves of marzipan "bread". Others believe that marzipan was actually invented in Persia a few hundred years before Lübeck claims to have invented it. The best known producer is Niederegger, which tourists often visit while in Lübeck, especially at Christmas time.

The Lübeck wine trade dates back to Hanseatic times. One Lübeck specialty is Rotspon, wine made from grapes processed and fermented in France and transported in wooden barrels to Lübeck, where it is stored, aged and bottled.

Like other coastal North German communities, Fischbrötchen and Brathering are popular takeaway foods, given the abundance of fish varieties.

Education

Lübeck has three universities, the University of Lübeck, the Technical University of Applied Sciences Lübeck, and the Lübeck Academy of Music. The Graduate School for Computing in Medicine and Life Sciences is a central faculty of the University and was founded by the German Excellence Initiative.
The International School of New Media is an affiliated institute of the university.

Districts

The city of Lübeck is divided into 10 zones. These again are arranged into altogether 35 urban districts. The 10 zones with their official numbers, their associated urban districts and the numbers of inhabitants of the quarters:

01 City centre (~ 12,000 inhabitants)
The Innenstadt is the main tourist attraction and consists of the old town as well as the former ramparts. It is the oldest and smallest part of Lübeck.
02 St. Jürgen (~ 40,000 inhabitants)
 Hüxtertor / Mühlentor / Gärtnergasse, Strecknitz / Rothebek, Blankensee, Wulfsdorf, Beidendorf, Krummesse, Kronsforde, Niederbüssau, Vorrade, Schiereichenkoppel, Oberbüssau
Sankt Jürgen is one of three historic suburbs of Lübeck (alongside St. Lorenz and St. Gertrud). It is located south of the city centre and the biggest of all city parts.
03 Moisling (~ 10,000 inhabitants)
 Niendorf / Moorgarten, Reecke, Old-Moisling / Genin
Moisling is situated in the far south-west. Its history dates back to the 17th century.
04 Buntekuh (~ 10,000 inhabitants)
Buntekuh lies in the west of Lübeck. A big part consists of commercial zones such as the Citti-Park, Lübeck's biggest mall.
05 St. Lorenz-South (~ 12,000 inhabitants)
Sankt Lorenz-Süd is located right in the south-west of the city centre and has the highest population density. The main train and bus station lie in its northern part.
06 St. Lorenz-North (~ 40,000 inhabitants)
 Holstentor-North, Falkenfeld / Vorwerk / Teerhof, Großsteinrade / Schönböcken, Dornbreite / Krempelsdorf
Sankt Lorenz-Nord is situated in the north-west of Lübeck. It is split from its southern part by the railways.
07 St. Gertrud (~ 40,000 inhabitants)
 Burgtor / Stadtpark, Marli / Brandenbaum, Eichholz, Karlshof / Israelsdorf / Gothmund
Sankt Gertrud is located in the east of the city centre. This part is mainly characterized by its nature. Many parks, the rivers Wakenitz and Trave and the forest Lauerholz make up a big part of its area.
08 Schlutup (~ 6,000 inhabitants)
Schlutup lies in the far east of Lübeck. Due to forest Lauerholz in its west and river Trave in the north, Schlutup is relatively isolated from the other city parts.
09 Kücknitz (~ 20,000 inhabitants)
 Dänischburg / Siems / Rangenberg / Wallberg, Herrenwyk, Alt-Kücknitz / Dummersdorf / Roter Hahn, Poeppendorf
North of river Trave lies Kücknitz. It is the old main industrial area of Lübeck.
10 Travemünde (~ 15,000 inhabitants)
 Ivendorf, Alt-Travemünde / Rönnau, Priwall, Teutendorf, Brodten
Travemünde is located in far northeastern Lübeck at the Baltic Sea. With its long beach and coast line, Travemünde is the second biggest tourist destination.

International relations

Twin towns – sister cities

Lübeck is twinned with:

  Kotka, Finland (1969)
  La Rochelle, France (1988)
  Wismar, Germany (1987)
  Klaipėda, Lithuania (1990)
  Gotland, Sweden (1999)

Friendly cities
Lübeck also has friendly relations with:

  Venice, Italy (1979)
  Kawasaki, Japan (1992)
  Shaoxing, China (2003)

Transport

Lübeck is connected to three main motorways (Autobahnen). The A1 Motorway is heading north to the Island of Fehmarn and Copenhagen (Denmark) and south to Hamburg, Bremen and Cologne. The A20 Motorway heads east towards Wismar, Rostock and Szczecin (Poland) and west to Bad Segeberg and to the North Sea. The A226 Motorway starts in central Lübeck and is heading to the north-east and the Seaport-City of Travemünde.

Lübeck is served by multiple train stations. The principal one is Lübeck Hauptbahnhof, with about 31,000 passengers per day, is the busiest station in Schleswig-Holstein. The station is mostly served by regional rail services to Hamburg, Lüneburg, Kiel, the Island of Fehmarn and Szczecin (Poland). There are some long-distance trains to Munich, Frankfurt-am-Main and Cologne. During the summer holidays, there are many extra rail services. Until the end of 2019, Lübeck was a stop on the "Vogelfluglinie" train line from Hamburg to Copenhagen (Denmark).

Public transport by bus is organized by the Lübeck City-Traffic-Company (Lübecker Stadtverkehr). There are 40 bus lines serving the city and the area around Lübeck, in addition to regional bus services.

The district of Travemünde is on the Baltic Sea and has the city's main port. The Scandinavienkai (the quay of Scandinavia) is the departure point for ferry routes to Malmö and Trelleborg (Sweden); Liepāja (Latvia); Helsinki (Finland) and Saint Petersburg (Russia). It is the second-biggest German port on the Baltic Sea.

Lübeck Airport is located in the south of Lübeck in the town of Blankensee. It provides regional flights to Munich and Stuttgart and some charter flights to Italy and Croatia.

Notable people

Religion 

 Laurentius Surius (1522–1578), Carthusian monk and hagiographer
 August Hermann Francke (1663–1727), pedagogue, theologian, founded the Francke Foundations
 Johann Lorenz von Mosheim (1693–1755), Lutheran church historian
 Ephraim Carlebach (1879–1936), rabbi and founder of the Higher Israelite School in Leipzig
 Joseph Carlebach (1883–1942), rabbi, victim of the Holocaust
 Felix Carlebach (1911–2008), rabbi

Politics

 Johann Wittenborg (1321–1363), Mayor of Lübeck, lost the Battle of Helsingborg
 Jürgen Wullenwever (c.1492–1537), burgomaster of Lübeck from 1533 to 1535
 George Wulweber, 16th-century Protestant who was tortured on the rack
 Friedrich Krüger (1819–1896), diplomat for the Hanseatic cities of Lübeck, Hamburg and Bremen
 John Rugee (1827–1894), politician in Wisconsin, USA
 Gustav Radbruch (1878–1949), legal scholar and politician
 Hermann Lüdemann (1880–1959), CDU politician
 Otto-Heinrich Drechsler (1895–1945), Mayor of Lübeck 1933 to 1937, set up the Riga ghetto
 Haim Cohn (1911–2002), Israeli jurist and politician
 Willy Brandt (1913–1992), SPD politician, German chancellor
 Björn Engholm (born 1939), SPD politician
 Robert Habeck (born 1969), writer and politician of the Alliance 90/The Greens 
 Birgitt Ory (born 1964), diplomat
 Beatrix von Storch (born 1971), AfD politician, former MEP

Art

 Benjamin Block (1631–1690), German-Hungarian Baroque painter
 Sir Godfrey Kneller (1646–1723), court painter of several British monarchs
 Catharina Elisabeth Heinecken (1683–1757), artist and alchemist
 Carl Heinrich von Heineken (1707–1791), art historian
 Friedrich Overbeck (1789–1869), painter and head of the Nazarenes
 Johann Wilhelm Cordes (1824–1869), landscape painter
 Gotthardt Kuehl (1850–1915), painter
 Maria Slavona (1865–1931), impressionist painter, sister of Cornelia Schorer
 Erich Ponto (1884–1957), actor
 Walter D. Asmus (born 1941), theatre director
 Justus von Dohnányi (born 1960), actor
 Jonas Nay (born 1990), actor

Music

 Franz Tunder (1614–1667), organist and composer
 Thomas Baltzar (c. 1631–1663), violinist and composer.
 Rüdiger Bohn (born 1960), conductor and professor
 Dieterich Buxtehude (c.1637–1707), composer and organist
 Andreas Kneller (1649–1724), composer and organist
 Friedrich Ludwig Æmilius Kunzen (1761–1817), composer
 Anja Thauer (1945–1973), cellist

Science

 Joachim Jungius (1587–1657), mathematician, physicist, and philosopher
 Heinrich Meibom (1638–1700), medical expert, discovered the Meibomian gland
 Hermann von Fehling (1811–1885), chemist
 Robert Christian Avé-Lallemant (1812–1884), physician and research traveler
 Ernst Curtius (1814–1896), classical archaeologist and historian
 Georg Curtius (1820–1885), philologist
 Friedrich Matthias Claudius (1822–1869), anatomist
 James Behrens (1824–1898), entomologist
 Friedrich Matz (1843–1874), archaeologist
 Friedrich Wilhelm Gustav Bruhn (1853–1927), invented the taximeter
 Cornelia Schorer (1863–1939), one of Germany's first female physicians
 Heinrich Lüders (1869–1943), orientalist and indologist
 Justus Mühlenpfordt (1911–2000), nuclear physicist
 Wolfgang Luthe (1922–1985), physician, psychotherapist and autogenic training pioneer

Writing

 Erasmus Finx (1627–1694), polyhistorian, author and church writer
 Christian Adolph Overbeck (1755–1821), mayor and poet
 Johann Bernhard Vermehren (1777–1803), romanticist and lecturer
 Emanuel Geibel (1815–1884), poet
 Gustav Falke (1853–1916), author
 Heinrich Mann (1871–1950), novelist
 Thomas Mann (1875–1955), novelist, Nobel Prize for Literature in 1929
 Friedrich Ranke (1882–1950), a German medievalist, philologist, folklorist and writer
 Jörg Wontorra (born 1948), sport journalist
 Nicolai Riedel (born 1952), philologist, author and an editor

Sport 
 Sandra Völker (born 1974), swimmer, won three medals at the 1996 Summer Olympics
 Marie-Louise Dräger (born 1981), five-time world champion lightweight sculler
 Tobias Kamke (born 1986), professional tennis player
 Maximilian Munski (born 1988), rower, silver medallist at the 2016 Summer Olympics

Other 

 Adam Brand (c. 1692–1746), merchant and researcher
 Christian Friedrich Heinecken (1721–1725), "the infant scholar of Lübeck", a child prodigy
 Kurd von Schlözer (1822–1894), diplomat and historian
 Hermann von der Hude (1830–1908), architect
 Hermann Blohm (1848–1930), shipbuilder and company founder
 Hermann Pister (1885–1948), Nazi SS commandant of Buchenwald Concentration Camp
 Walter Ewers (1892–1918), flying ace of WWI
 Hans Blumenberg (1920–1996), philosopher
 Jörg Ziercke (born 1947), chief commissioner of the Federal Criminal Police Office 2004–2014

See also
 Bombing of Lübeck in World War II
 Cap Arcona
 Lübeck Airport
 Lübeck Hauptbahnhof
 Lübeck law
 Lübeck Nordic Film Days
 Lübecker Nachrichten—Lübeck's only newspaper
 Oberschule zum Dom
 Ports of the Baltic Sea
 Schleswig-Holstein Musik Festival
 VfB Lübeck, football and sports club

References

Citations

General and cited references

External links

 
 Official tourism site
 The Jewish Encyclopedia: "Lübeck" by Gotthard Deutsch (1906).
 Hanseatic City of Lübeck: UNESCO Official Website
 Panoramas of Lübeck
 Lovebridge Lübeck
 
 

 
1140s establishments in the Holy Roman Empire
1143 establishments in Europe
Cities in Schleswig-Holstein
Hanseatic Cities
Landmarks in Germany
Members of the Hanseatic League
Populated coastal places in Germany (Baltic Sea)
Port cities and towns in Germany
Port cities and towns of the Baltic Sea
World Heritage Sites in Germany